Steffen Zühlke is a German rower who won one bronze Olympic medal in the single sculls during the 1988 Summer Olympics in Seoul as well as one more in the World Rowing Cup II in Mannheim.
Furthermore, he participated in the World Rowing Junior Championships in Vichy, France in 1983 where he won a silver medal at the age of 18.

Zühlke is currently living in Unterhaching, Germany.

References

External links 
World Rowing Website
Steffen Zühlke, Sports Reference LLC

1965 births
Living people
Sportspeople from Schwerin
Rowers at the 1988 Summer Olympics
Olympic bronze medalists for East Germany
Olympic rowers of East Germany
Olympic medalists in rowing
East German male rowers
Medalists at the 1988 Summer Olympics